The 25th Public Security Protection Brigade named after Prince Askold is a division within the Northern Operational-Territorial Command of the National Guard of Ukraine. Its headquarters is located in Kyiv.

History 
In 1966, in accordance with the decision of the Council of Ministers of the Ukrainian SSR, the 1st Special Motorized Police Regiment of the Ministry of Internal Affairs of the USSR was formed. In 1995, the regiment was subordinated to the Internal Troops of Ukraine where it was renamed into the 10th special motorized regiment. In 2014, the brigade became part of the newly restored National Guard of Ukraine. 30 September is considered the professional holiday of the unit.

On the occasion of the 30th Independence Day of Ukraine Ukrainian President Volodymyr Zelensky renamed the unit's name to honour Prince Askold.

Structure 
 Brigade HQ
 NGU National Honor Guard Battalion
 1st Patrol Battalion
 2nd Patrol Battalion
 3rd Patrol Battalion
 4th Patrol Battalion
 5th Patrol Battalion

Commanders 
 Colonel Volodymyr Shelefost (2014-2018)
 Colonel Vitaly Danko (2018)

References 

Brigades of the Ukrainian Ground Forces
Military units and formations established in 1966
Military units and formations of Ukraine in the war in Donbas
Units and formations of the National Guard of Ukraine